Malapterurus cavalliensis is a species of electric catfish endemic to Ivory Coast where it occurs in the Cavally River.  This species grows to a length of  SL.

References

 

Malapteruridae
Catfish of Africa
Freshwater fish of West Africa
Endemic fauna of Ivory Coast
Fish described in 2000
Strongly electric fish